Ali Kuçik (born 17 June 1991) is a Turkish footballer who plays for TFF Third League club Nevşehir Belediyespor. He made a Süper Lig appearance at the age of 18.

Career
Kuçik began his footballing career at Yavuz Sultan Selim Sport Academy in 2003. He played for Yavuz Sultan Selim for a year and scored 40 goals. Ali Kuçik joined Beşiktaş in 2004. He was promoted to Beşiktaş A2 in 2006. He played as a forward or right-sided winger. He was so successful that he was called to Beşiktaş A team by Ertuğrul Sağlam in 2008. He signed a professional contract with Beşiktaş on 3 January 2008.

He played his first official game for Beşiktaş on 5 January 2008 against Diskispor at The Turkish Cup (Turkish: Türkiye Kupası) replacing İbrahim Üzülmez for the last 20 minutes.

Ali Kuçik played for Beşiktaş A2 between 2007 and 2010 at Turkey Football Federation A2 League. He played for 89 games, scoring 43.

Ali Kuçik signed a contract extension on 18 January 2010 and was promoted to Beşiktaş A team by Bernd Schuster.

He played his first game for Beşiktaş against FC Porto in the UEFA Europa League. His debut for Beşiktaş in the Turkish Super League was on 28 November 2010 against Galatasaray replacing Filip Hološko. He was first fielded by Bernd Schuster for Beşiktaş first 11 on 5 December 2010 against Bursaspor. On 19 December 2010 he scored his first goal for Besiktas in the Turkish Süper Lig in the match against Gaziantepspor.

National Team Career

Ali Kuçik first capped for Turkey U-16 on 12 September 2006 against Russia U-16. He won Aegean U-16 cup with Turkey in January 2007. He also won Viktor Bannikov Cup with Turkey U-16 in June 2007. In August 2007, he won second place at the Blacksea Games, losing final on penalties. He was capped for Turkey U-16 for 15 times, scoring 4 goals.

He first represented Turkey U-17 in 2008 against England U-17. In total he played for Turkey U-17 for 15 times, scoring 3 goals.

Ali Kuçik first capped for Turkey U-18 on 2 December 2008 against France U-18. He then capped for Turkey U-18 for 11 times, scoring 3 goals.

Ali Kuçik then first capped for Turkey U-19 on 11 August 2009 against Ukraine U-19. He was capped for Turkey U-19 for 9 times in total.

He was also capped for Turkey U-20 first time in August 2010 at Labonovski Football Tournament in Kiev.

PS.:  Despite many web sides refers him as a defender, Ali Kuçik has never played as a defender. He was mainly used as a striker, or occasionally as a right sided winger/forward.

External links
 
 
 

1991 births
Sportspeople from Kastamonu
Living people
Turkish footballers
Turkey youth international footballers
Turkey under-21 international footballers
Turkey B international footballers
Association football forwards
Beşiktaş J.K. footballers
Bucaspor footballers
Kardemir Karabükspor footballers
Göztepe S.K. footballers
TKİ Tavşanlı Linyitspor footballers
Fatih Karagümrük S.K. footballers
1461 Trabzon footballers
Kastamonuspor footballers
Sarıyer S.K. footballers
Bandırmaspor footballers
Turgutluspor footballers
Süper Lig players
TFF First League players
TFF Second League players
TFF Third League players